A right-of-way (ROW, not to be confused with "right of way" without hyphens) is a right to make a way over a piece of land, usually to and from another piece of land. A right of way is a type of easement granted or reserved over the land for transportation purposes, such as a highway, public footpath, rail transport, canal, as well as electrical transmission lines, oil and gas pipelines.  In the case of an easement, it may revert to its original owners if the facility is abandoned. This American English term is also used to denote the land itself.

A right of way is granted or reserved over the land for transportation purposes, usually for private access to private land and, historically for a highway, public footpath, rail transport, canal, as well as electrical transmission lines, oil and gas pipelines. A right-of-way is reserved for the purposes of maintenance or expansion of existing services with the right-of-way.

Rail right-of-way
In the United States, railroad rights-of-way (ROW or R/O/W) are generally considered private property by the respective railroad owners and by applicable state laws.  Most U.S. railroads employ their own police forces, who can arrest and prosecute trespassers found on their rights-of-way. Some railroad rights-of-way include recreational rail trails.

In Canada, railroad rights-of-way are regulated by federal law.

In the United Kingdom, railway companies received the right to resume land for a right-of-way by a private Act of Parliament.

Designations of railroad right of way 

The various designations of railroad right of way are as follows:
Active track is any track that is used regularly or even only once in a while.
Out of service means the right of way is preserved, and the railroad retains the right to activate it. The line could be out of service for decades. Thus track or crossings that have been removed need to be replaced.
By an embargo the track is removed, but the right of way is preserved and usually is converted into a walking or cycling path or other such use. 
An abandonment is a lengthy formal process by which the railroad gives up all rights to the line. In most cases the track is removed and sold for scrap and any grade crossings are redone. The line will never be active again. The right of way reverts to the adjoining property owners.

Rail rights-of-way uses other than rail transport
 
Railroad rights-of-way need not be exclusively for railroad tracks and related equipment. Easements are frequently given to permit the laying of communication cables (such as optical fiber) or natural gas pipelines, or to run electric power transmission lines overhead, along a railroad.

See also

 Eminent domain
 Noise barrier
 Permanent way
 Right of way (public throughway)
 Right of way (traffic)
 Rights of way in England and Wales

References

Rail infrastructure
Road transport